International human rights instruments are the treaties and other international texts that serve as legal sources for international human rights law and the protection of human rights in general. There are many varying types, but most can be classified into two broad categories: declarations, adopted by bodies such as the United Nations General Assembly, which are by nature declaratory, so not legally-binding although they may be politically authoritative and very well-respected soft law;, and often express guiding principles; and conventions that are multi-party treaties that are designed to become legally binding, usually include prescriptive and very specific language, and usually are concluded by a long procedure that frequently requires ratification by each states'  legislature. Lesser known are some "recommendations" which are similar to conventions in being multilaterally agreed, yet cannot be ratified, and serve to set common standards. There may also be administrative guidelines that are agreed multilaterally by states, as well as the statutes of tribunals or other institutions. A specific prescription or principle from any of these various international instruments can, over time, attain the status of customary international law whether it is specifically accepted by a state or not, just because it is well-recognized and followed over a sufficiently long time.

International human rights instruments can be divided further into global instruments, to which any state in the world can be a party, and regional instruments, which are restricted to states in a particular region of the world.

Most conventions and recommendations (but few declarations) establish mechanisms for monitoring and establish bodies to oversee their implementation. In some cases these bodies that may have relatively little political authority or legal means, and may be ignored by member states; in other cases these mechanisms have bodies with great political authority and their decisions are almost always implemented. A good example of the latter is the European Court of Human Rights.

Monitoring mechanisms also vary as to the degree of individual access to expose cases of abuse and plea for remedies. Under some conventions or recommendations – e.g. the European Convention on Human Rights – individuals or states are permitted, subject to certain conditions, to take individual cases to a full-fledged tribunal at international level. Sometimes, this can be done in national courts because of universal jurisdiction.

The Universal Declaration of Human Rights, the International Covenant on Civil and Political Rights, and the International Covenant on Economic, Social and Cultural Rights together with other international human rights instruments are sometimes referred to as the international bill of rights. International human rights instruments are identified by the OHCHR and most are referenced on the OHCHR website.

Declarations

Global 
Declaration of the Rights of the Child 1923
Universal Declaration of Human Rights (UN, 1948)
Declaration on the Rights of Disabled Persons (UN, 1975)
Declaration on the Right to Development (UN, 1986) (UN, 1979)
Vienna Declaration and Programme of Action (World Conference on Human Rights, 1993)
Beijing Declaration and Platform for Action (The Fourth World Conference on Women, 1995)
Declaration of Human Duties and Responsibilities (UNESCO, 1998)
Universal Declaration on Cultural Diversity (UNESCO, 2001)
Declaration on the Rights of Indigenous Peoples (UN, 2007)
UN declaration on sexual orientation and gender identity (UN, 2008)

Regional: Americas 
 American Declaration of the Rights and Duties of Man (OAS, 1948)
American Declaration on the Rights of Indigenous Peoples (OAS, 2016)

Regional: Asia 
 Declaration of the Basic Duties of ASEAN Peoples and Governments (Regional Council of Human Rights in Asia, 1983)
 ASEAN Human Rights Declaration (ASEAN, 2009)

Regional: Middle East 
 Cairo Declaration of Human Rights in Islam (OIC,1990)

Conventions

Global 
According to OHCHR, there are 9 or more core international human rights instruments and several optional protocols. Among the well-known instruments are:

Convention on the Elimination of All Forms of Racial Discrimination (ICERD, 21 December 1965)
International Covenant on Civil and Political Rights (ICCPR, 16 December 1966)
International Covenant on Economic, Social, and Cultural Rights (ICESCR, 16 December 1966)
Convention on the Elimination of All Forms of Discrimination Against Women (CEDAW, 18 December 1979)
Inaugural HURIDOCS Assembly (HURIDOCS, 24 July 1982)
SOS-Torture Convention (OMCT, 14 April 1983)
Convention against Torture and Other Cruel, Inhuman or Degrading Treatment or Punishment (CAT, 10 December 1984)
Convention on the Rights of the Child (CRC, 20 November 1989)
International Convention on the Protection of the Rights of All Migrant Workers and Members of Their Families (ICMW, 18 December 1990)
International Convention for the Protection of All Persons from Enforced Disappearance (CPED, 20 December 2006)
Convention on the Rights of Persons with Disabilities (CRPD, 13 December 2006)

Several more human rights instruments exist. A few examples:

The International Convention on the Suppression and Punishment of the Crime of Apartheid (ICSPCA)
International Convention on the Protection of the Rights of All Migrant Workers and Members of Their Families
Convention Relating to the Status of Refugees and Protocol Relating to the Status of Refugees
Convention on the Reduction of Statelessness
Convention on the Prevention and Punishment of the Crime of Genocide
Indigenous and Tribal Peoples Convention, 1989 (ILO 169)

Regional: Africa 
African Charter on Human and Peoples' Rights (June, 1981)
African Charter on the Rights and Welfare of the Child (1990)
Maputo Protocol (11 July 2003)
 African Youth Charter (June 30,2006)
 African Disability Protocol (June 30,2019)
SADC Gender Protocol (revised version enters into force 2018)

Regional: America 
American Convention on Human Rights
Inter-American Convention to Prevent and Punish Torture
Inter-American Convention on Forced Disappearance of Persons
Inter-American Convention on the Prevention, Punishment, and Eradication of Violence against Women 
Inter-American Convention on the Elimination of All Forms of Discrimination against Persons with Disabilities

Regional: Europe 
Charter of Fundamental Rights of the European Union
Convention on Action against Trafficking in Human Beings
European Convention on Nationality
European Charter for Regional or Minority Languages (ECRML)
European Convention on Human Rights (ECHR)
European Convention for the Prevention of Torture and Inhuman or Degrading Treatment or Punishment (CPT)
European Social Charter (ESC), and Revised Social Charter
Framework Convention for the Protection of National Minorities (FCNM)

Regional: Middle East 
Arab Charter on Human Rights (ACHR) (22 May 2004)

See also 

Universal jurisdiction
Rule of Law in Armed Conflicts Project (RULAC)
International Criminal Court (established in 2002)
International human rights law
Human rights inflation
Human rights treaty bodies
List of human rights organizations
List of indigenous rights organizations
List of international animal welfare conventions
Rule of law
Rule According to Higher Law

References

External links
International Human Rights Instruments - U.N. list
International Justice Resource Center News and resources for international human rights law

Human rights instruments
Human rights treaties
Children's rights instruments
Women's rights instruments